Dodjé is one of four departments in Logone Occidental, a region of Chad. Its capital is Beinamar.Its located south west of Chad near the border with Cameroon.

Departments of Chad
Logone Occidental Region